Norman Anthony Smiley (born February 28, 1965) is an English-American retired professional wrestler. He is best known for his appearances with the Mexican promotion Consejo Mundial de Lucha Libre from 1991 to 1995 and with the American promotion World Championship Wrestling from 1997 to 2001. He currently works for WWE as a trainer for NXT. Championships held by Smiley over the course of his career include the CMLL World Heavyweight Championship and the WCW Hardcore Championship.

Early life
Smiley was born in Northampton, England in the United Kingdom. In the early 1970s, his parents divorced and Smiley and his mother emigrated to Miami, Florida in the United States. Smiley attended Miami Beach Senior High School, where he took part in amateur wrestling and powerlifting. He graduated in 1984.

Professional wrestling career

Early career (1985–1991)
Norman Smiley trained under Boris Malenko and Dean Malenko before making his debut in 1985 on the Floridian independent circuit. He was originally known as "Black Magic", then as the hated "Lord Henry Norman". Smiley wrestled in Japanese shoot-style group the Universal Wrestling Federation in 1988 and 1989. In 1990 Smiley competed at the World Championship Wrestling Starrcade 1990 event teaming with Chris Adams against the team of Konnan and Rey Misterio, Sr.

Consejo Mundial de Lucha Libre (1991–1995)
In 1991, he began wrestling for Consejo Mundial de Lucha Libre in Mexico as "Black Magic", winning the CMLL World Heavyweight Championship and holding it until losing to Brazo de Plata in 1993.

Extreme Championship Wrestling (1995–1996)
In 1995 and 1996, he briefly competed in the Philadelphia, Pennsylvania-based Extreme Championship Wrestling promotion.

World Championship Wrestling

Early years (1997–1999)
Smiley signed with World Championship Wrestling (WCW) in 1997, making his debut on a television taping of Pro by defeating Manny Fernandez on October 9, 1997. Smiley made his televised debut and first pay-per-view appearance at the World War 3 event on November 23, competing in the titular battle royal; however the match was won by Scott Hall. After being removed from television, he returned on the February 9, 1998 episode of Nitro, with a new gimmick, which saw him perform his signature dance move, the "Big Wiggle". However, in his return match, he would be defeated by Konnan. Smiley received his first title shot in WCW on the June 8 episode of Nitro as he unsuccessfully challenged Fit Finlay for the World Television Championship. At Fall Brawl, Smiley faced Ernest Miller in a losing effort.

Smiley turned heel in a backstage interview on the December 19 episode of Saturday Night, where he mocked the fans for saying his name incorrectly. At Starrcade, he defeated Prince Iaukea. He then feuded with Chavo Guerrero Jr., on one occasion destroying Guerrero's hobby horse mascot, Pepè, by feeding it into a wood chipper on the  January 11, 1999 episode of Nitro. This culminated in a match between the two at Souled Out on January 17, which Smiley won.

Hardcore Champion (1999–2001)
In late 1999, Smiley entered the hardcore division. He participated in a tournament for the vacant WCW World Heavyweight Championship, in which he defeated Bam Bam Bigelow in the opening round in a hardcore match on the October 25 episode of Nitro before losing to Billy Kidman in a hardcore match in the second round on November 1. Smiley would go on to become the inaugural title holder of the WCW Hardcore Championship by defeating Brian Knobbs in a tournament final at Mayhem on November 21. During his run with the championship, he would adopt the nickname 'Screamin', due to constantly screeching in a high-pitched tone during his matches, because of his fear of weapons. He would also often wear protective sports equipment as he entered the ring, usually also in the uniform of a local pro or collegiate sports team to gain a cheap pop. He successfully defended the title against The Wall, Rhonda Sing and Fit Finlay while also retaining the title against Meng at Starrcade. Smiley unsuccessfully challenged Jeff Jarrett for the United States Heavyweight Championship in a Bunkhouse Brawl on January 6, 2000 episode of Thunder. The following week, on Thunder, Smiley lost the Hardcore Championship to Knobbs, which he failed to regain at Souled Out in a fatal four-way match also involving Fit Finlay and Meng.

Smiley would then begin feuding with 3 Count, competing against the trio in a handicap match at SuperBrawl 2000, which Smiley lost. At Uncensored, Smiley teamed with The Demon to defeat XS (Lane and Rave) in a tag team match. On the April 10 episode of Nitro, all the WCW titles were declared vacant and the promotion was re-booted in storyline. At Spring Stampede, Smiley faced Terry Funk in a hardcore match for the vacant Hardcore Championship, which Funk won. Smiley would continue to feud with Funk over the title and recruited Chris Jericho's former associate Ralphus to be his manager. With the assistance of Ralphus, he stole a backyard wrestling championship from a group of children during a vignette. Smiley and Ralphus unsuccessfully challenged Funk for the title in handicap matches at Slamboree and the following night's edition of Nitro. On the May 23 episode of Nitro, Smiley teamed with Funk to challenge Shane Douglas for the title in a handicap match, which Funk won. Smiley would then continue to pursue the Hardcore Championship as he unsuccessfully challenged Big Vito and Lance Storm for the title on various occasions.

On the August 14 episode of Nitro, Smiley defeated newly crowned champion Carl Ouellet to win his second Hardcore Championship. He successfully defended the title against KroniK in a handicap match on the August 21 episode of Nitro and MI Smooth in an "I Quit" match on the August 23 episode of Thunder. Smiley was stripped off the title by the WCW Commissioner Mike Sanders on the September 27 episode of Nitro. Smiley made his final pay-per-view appearance in WCW at Millennium Final, where he participated in an 18-man battle royal which he failed to win. Later that night, he defeated Fit Finlay in an Octoberfest Hardcore match.

Smiley's final angle in WCW took place in early 2001, where he was placed with the returning Glacier in comedic skits where he was supposed to aid Smiley in his matches but took his time coming to the ring in order to interact with fans. He then entered the ring after the fact to pose for the fans before pushing Smiley out of the way to perform his old kata routine. This would lead to Smiley lose his matches. Smiley remained in WCW until the company was sold to the World Wrestling Federation in March 2001. He was not hired by the WWF following the sale.

Independent circuit (2001–2008)
Smiley wrestled for the short-lived X Wrestling Federation and the World Wrestling All-Stars before returning to the independent circuit.

NWA Total Nonstop Action (2002, 2006–2007)
He wrestled briefly for NWA Total Nonstop Action in 2002 and then had several tryout matches with WWE in 2003 and 2004. In February 2006, he was backstage during the TNA pay-per-view Against All Odds 2006, and he wrestled in an eight-man opening match on an episode of TNA Impact! shortly thereafter, doing the Big Wiggle on Jeff Jarrett. At TNA Destination X 2006, Smiley and Shark Boy lost to David Young and Elix Skipper. on the March 18 episode of Impact, Smiley and Shark Boy defeated The Latin American Xchange (Homicide and Machete). on the April 8 episode of Impact, Smiley and Shark Boy competed against Elix Skipper and David Young with the match ending in a no contest when Jeff Jarrett's Army (Jeff Jarrett, Scott Steiner, and America's Most Wanted) attacked all four men and Smiley was inactive for several weeks following an attack at the hands of Scott Steiner, but returned on the June 29 episode of Impact!, losing to Monty Brown. on the July 13 episode of Impact, Smiley lost to Abyss. on the September 7 episode of Impact, Smiley, Shark Boy and The James Gang lost to America's Most Wanted, Matt Bentley and Kazarian. on the October 5 episode of Impact, Smiley competed in a fatal five-way match which was won by Shark Boy. on the October 19 episode of Impact, Smiley lost to Christian Cage in a street fight. At Bound for Glory, Smiley competed in Open Invitational X Division Gauntlet battle royal which was won by Austin Starr. On the February 16, 2007 episode of Impact! Smiley made his return, teaming with Shark Boy in a loss to The Latin American Xchange (Homicide and Machete) this tag team match would turn out to be Smiley's final match with TNA.

WWE (2007–present)
In 2007, Smiley relocated to Orlando to work as a trainer for WWE's then development territory, Florida Championship Wrestling. He also wrestled his last WWE match in November 2007 against Vladimir Kozlov in a dark match at a Heat taping.  In early 2010, he started making on-camera appearances as the lieutenant general manager of FCW and later in August of that year he was known on FCW TV as the liaison for the FCW president, Steve Keirn.

Since its inception as a developmental territory, Smiley has continued to work as a trainer for WWE in NXT.

Championships and accomplishments
Consejo Mundial de Lucha Libre
CMLL World Heavyweight Championship (1 time)
Four Star Championship Wrestling
FSCW Heavyweight Championship (1 time)
Future of Wrestling
FOW Heavyweight Championship (1 time)
Global Wrestling Alliance
GWA Global Television Championship (1 time)
Independent Pro Wrestling Association
IPWA Southern Championship (1 time)
IPWA Tag Team Championship (1 time) - with Joe DeFuria
Maximum Pro Wrestling
MXPW Heavyweight Championship (1 time)
Pro Wrestling Illustrated
Ranked No. 107 of the 500 best singles wrestler of the PWI 500 in 2000
Ranked No. 375 of the 500 best singles wrestlers of the PWI Years in 2003
World Championship Wrestling
WCW Hardcore Championship (2 times)
Xtreme Wrestling Alliance
XWA World Heavyweight Championship (1 time)

References

External links
 
 
 

1965 births
20th-century African-American sportspeople
20th-century professional wrestlers
21st-century African-American people
21st-century professional wrestlers
African-American male professional wrestlers
American male professional wrestlers
Black British sportsmen
English emigrants to the United States
English male professional wrestlers
Expatriate professional wrestlers in Japan
Living people
Sportspeople from Northampton
Professional wrestlers from Florida
Professional wrestling trainers
Sportspeople from Miami
CMLL World Heavyweight Champions